Sergio Agatino Garufi (born 16 September 1995) is an Italian footballer who plays as a midfielder for Serie C club Latina Calcio 1932.

Club career
Born in Giarre, Garufi began his career on Catania's youth categories, and was promoted to main squad for 2013–14 season, receiving the no. 39 jersey.

On 15 January 2014 Garufi made his professional debut, coming on as a second-half substitute in a 1–4 home loss against Siena, for the campaign's Coppa Italia.

On 2 February 2015 he was signed by Santarcangelo in a temporary deal.

On 23 September 2015 Garufi was signed by FeralpiSalò as a free agent. On 22 January 2016 he left for Catanzaro.

On 25 August 2016 he was signed by Lupa Roma.

In August 2018, he signed with Matera in the Serie C. He left the club at the end of February 2019 and was without club until November 2019, where he joined Serie D club Latina Calcio 1932.

References

External links
Catania official profile 

1995 births
Sportspeople from the Province of Catania
Living people
Italian footballers
Association football wingers
Catania S.S.D. players
Santarcangelo Calcio players
FeralpiSalò players
U.S. Catanzaro 1929 players
Lupa Roma F.C. players
Reggina 1914 players
Matera Calcio players
Latina Calcio 1932 players
Serie A players
Serie B players
Serie C players
Serie D players
Footballers from Sicily